Joe Chindamo  (born 1961) is an Australian composer and pianist.

Career
He recorded an album with violinist Zoë Black in 2012. It was followed by  Dido's Lament and The New Goldberg Variations. In 2014, Chindamo's string quartet Tempesta was commissioned and performed by the Acacia Quartet and by the Australian String Quartet on their national tour in 2016. His Toccata for Solo Violin, commissioned by Australian violinist Sarah Curro, was performed by Ann Marie Johnson at the ABC Young Performers' Awards and recorded by Zoe Black for their album Symbiosis in 2017. In 2014 two of his Baroque re-imaginings for string orchestra were performed by ACO Collective.

His other works include Palimpsest, performed as part of the QSO Maestro Series conducted by Muhai Tang; Sanctuary, a double oboe and Cor Anglais concerto composed for Diana Doherty, Alexandre Ougey and Camerata, performed at the Queensland Music Festival; American Spirit composed for Black, and Fantaskatto, a vocal scat concerto composed for Olivia Chindamo, both performed by the Queensland Symphony Orchestra.

In 2017, Chindamo began a collaboration with librettist Steve Vizard. They created Vigil, a one-woman show starring Christie Whelan Browne which was performed at the Adelaide Cabaret Festival and the Fairfax Studio (Melbourne Arts Centre). He arranged several songs for The Great American Song Book by James Morrison. His arrangement of 'Round Midnight was performed by Morrison and the BBC Orchestra at the BBC Proms in London. He was commissioned to compose a drum concerto for the Melbourne Symphony Orchestra which was premiered at "The Last Night at the Proms" concert in March 2018 at Hamer Hall and was conducted by Andrew Davis.

Chindamo was awarded the Medal of the Order of Australia in the 2022 Queen's Birthday Honours.

Discography

Albums

Awards and honours

AIR Awards
The Australian Independent Record Awards (commonly known informally as AIR Awards) is an annual awards night to recognise, promote and celebrate the success of Australia's independent music sector.

|-
| AIR Awards of 2010
|Another Place and Time 
| Best Independent Jazz Album
| 
|-
| AIR Awards of 2020
| Arias
| Best Independent Jazz Album or EP
| 
|-

APRA Awards
The APRA Awards are held in Australia and New Zealand by the Australasian Performing Right Association to recognise songwriting skills, sales and airplay performance by its members annually.

|-
| rowspan="2"| 2009.
| "Something Will Come to Light"
| rowspan="2"| Jazz Work of the Year
| 
|-
| "Moments and Eternities"
| 
|-

ARIA Music Awards
The ARIA Music Awards are presented annually from 1987 by the Australian Recording Industry Association (ARIA). Chindamo has been nominated for seven awards.

! 
|-
| 1998
| Anyone Who Had a Heart
| ARIA Award for Best Jazz Album
| 
|rowspan="5" |
|-
| 2001
| The Joy of Standards (as Joe Chindamo Trio)
| Best Jazz Album
| 
|-
| 2007
| Smokingun (with Graeme Lyall)
| Best Jazz Album
| 
|-
| 2008
| Duende The Romantic Project
| Best Jazz Album
| 
|-
| 2010
| Another Place Some Other Time
| Best Jazz Album
| 
|-
| 2014
| Dido's Lament (with Zoë Black)
| Best Classical Album
| 
|rowspan="2" | 
|-
| 2016
| The New Goldberg Variations (with Zoë Black)
| Best Classical Album
| 
|-

Mo Awards
The Australian Entertainment Mo Awards (commonly known informally as the Mo Awards), were annual Australian entertainment industry awards. They recognise achievements in live entertainment in Australia from 1975 to 2016. Joe Chindamo won two awards in that time.
 (wins only)
|-
| 2001
| Joe Chindamo
| Jazz Instrumental Performer of the Year
| 
|-
| 2003
| Joe Chindamo
| Jazz Instrumental Performer of the Year
| 
|-

References

1951 births
Living people
Recipients of the Medal of the Order of Australia
APRA Award winners
Australian jazz composers
Male jazz composers